Cameraria quadrifasciata is a moth of the family Gracillariidae. It is known from Selangor, Malaysia.

The larvae feed on Bauhinia species, including Bauhinia griffithiana. They mine the leaves of their host plant. The mine has the form of a small, oblong blotch-mine occurring on the upper side of the leaf usually on the leaf-veins. It is whitish and fiat at first, then discoloured into brown and deformed into a tentiform type. Leaf tissue within the mine is completely consumed by the larva. Pupation takes place within the mine without a distinct cocoon.

References

Cameraria (moth)

Leaf miners
Moths of Malaysia
Moths described in 1993
Taxa named by Tosio Kumata